Gustave is a ghost town in Harding County, in the U.S. state of South Dakota. The GNIS classifies it as a populated place.

History
A post office called Gustave was established in 1899, and remained in operation until 1954. The town has the name of Gustave Sorenson, an early settler.

References

Ghost towns in South Dakota
Geography of Harding County, South Dakota